Subramaniam Panchu Arunachalam, credited as Subbu Panchu or P. Ar. Subramaniam (born 16 February 1973) is an Indian actor and film producer. Son of noted writer-producer Panchu Arunachalam, Subbu first appeared as a child artist in the Malayalam film Daisy, before working in the production department of his father's P. A. Art Productions. He returned to acting with the television series Arasi and shot to fame following his performance in the 2010 comedy film Boss Engira Bhaskaran. Subbu has occasionally worked as a voice actor and choreographer as well.

Career 
Subbu, being born as the son to writer-producer Panchu Arunachalam, had been in the film industry since his childhood. He made his acting debut at age 14 as a child artist in the Malayalam film Daisy, directed by Pratap Pothen, who was then his neighbour. He was soon made by his father to work as an assistant production manager under Balagopi in his father's P. A. Art Productions for the Rajinikanth-starrer Guru Sishyan. Since Guru Sishyan, Subbu was involved in all the productions until the most recent release Maya Kannadi (2007), with Subbu being promoted from an executive producer to the main producer.

In 2002, Subbu acted in a film directed by Agathiyan, Kadhal Samrajyam, as one of its lead actors,  However, after the release of the soundtrack, the film was shelved and was never released. In 2008, he ventured into television and appeared in the popular television drama series Arasi on Sun TV. He was approached by its director Samuthirakani to play the antagonist's role in the film, a role which was initially supposed to last for a week only, but was extended following positive responses. His first Tamil film was Saroja (2008), in which he had a cameo appearance. Meri Subbu returned to the big screen with M. Rajesh's comedy film Boss Engira Bhaskaran, in which he played a pivotal character as the brother of the character played by Arya. The film became one  of 2010's biggest commercial successes, which brought Subbu into the limelight and subsequently led to several more acting offers. He starred in Cloud Nine Movies' Thoonga Nagaram as a tahsildar, and appeared in films including Ajith Kumar's Mankatha where he played a CBI Officer, Kamal Ekambaram, as a negative role.

Subbu had previously also worked as a choreographer in the K. Balachander-produced Vidukadhai, and as a voice actor, dubbing for actors Suman and Mukesh Tiwari in Sivaji: The Boss and Kandaswamy, respectively.

He has also appeared in advertisements for Hamam and Lakshmi ceramics. Currently he is hosting a game show, Aayirathil Oruvan, on Zee Tamil channel.

Filmography

Films 
All films are in Tamil, unless otherwise noted.

Television

Dubbing artist 
 Suman (Sivaji, Rudramadevi, Irumbu Thirai, Vantha Rajavathaan Varuven, The Legend)
 Mukesh Tiwari (Kandaswamy)
 Jamie Foxx (The Amazing Spider-Man 2)
 Jagapathi Babu (Kaththi Sandai) 
 Adil Hussain (Yatchan)
 R. Amarendran (Jil Jung Juk)

Producer credits 
 Guru Sishyan (1988) – co-producer
 Michael Madhana Kamarajan (1991) – executive producer
 Rasukutty (1992) – co-producer
 Thambi Pondatti (1992) – co-producer
 Veera (1994) – co-producer
 Poovellam Kettuppar (1999) – co-producer
 Rishi (2001) – co-producer
 Solla Marandha Kadhai (2002) – co-producer
 Maya Kannadi (2007) – producer
 Chennai 600028 II: Second Innings (2016) – executive producer

References

External links 
 
 Subbu Panchu on Facebook

Indian male film actors
Tamil male actors
Television personalities from Tamil Nadu
Living people
Film producers from Tamil Nadu
Tamil film producers
Indian male voice actors
1981 births
Male actors in Tamil cinema
Male actors in Malayalam cinema
Male actors in Telugu cinema
21st-century Indian male actors
Tamil male television actors